Brunella can refer to:
Brunella Forel, 1917, ant, synonym of Malagidris
Brunella Smith, 1909, copepod, synonym of Calamoecia
Brunella Mill., plant, synonym of Prunella